Will Skinner  may refer to:
Will Skinner (American football), American football coach
Will Skinner (rugby union), rugby player

See also
William Skinner (disambiguation)